Phrynocephalus hispidus, the Dzhungar variegated toadhead agama, is a species of agamid lizard found in China.

References

hispidus
Reptiles described in 1909
Taxa named by Jacques von Bedriaga